Curtis M. Loftis Jr. (born September 8, 1958) is an American politician, businessman and philanthropist. He currently serves as the Treasurer of South Carolina. A member of the Republican Party, Loftis has held elective office since 2010.

Early life and education
Loftis was born in Columbia, South Carolina. He attended Brookland-Cayce High School and graduated from the University of South Carolina in 1981. Loftis was twice elected president of the Student Senate and served as president of the Pi Kappa Alpha fraternity.

Business and philanthropy

Loftis is the owner of several central South Carolina businesses and is involved in real estate.

In 1999, Loftis established Saluda Charitable Foundation and remains the principal benefactor. The foundation's activities are faith-based and provide nutritional and housing services to orphans and the elderly.  SCF provided over 500,000 meals to the needy and supported medical missions in Haiti.

2010 election

In March 2010, Loftis announced his candidacy for South Carolina State Treasurer in the Republican primary.  Loftis characterized himself as a conservative reform candidate.

Loftis was endorsed by former Massachusetts Governor Mitt Romney, former Arkansas Governor Mike Huckabee, former Pennsylvania Senator Rick Santorum,  and former US Speaker of the House Newt Gingrich. Loftis received many state Tea Party movement endorsements including many in the business community and several newspaper endorsements.

On June 8, 2010, Loftis defeated the incumbent State Treasurer, Converse Chellis in the Republican Primary with 62% of the vote, carrying all of the state's 46 counties.

Treasurer Loftis became the first Republican to defeat a sitting incumbent in a statewide GOP primary.

2014 election

Treasurer Loftis won the Primary with a 62% of the vote and was unopposed in the general election to remain the State Treasurer.

2018 election

Treasurer Curtis Loftis defeated Rosalyn Glenn (D) and Sarah Work (American Party) in the general election on November 6, 2018.

2022 election

Treasurer Curtis Loftis had no Primary opponent and as such was automatically the Republican nominee.  No Democrat candidate filed to challenge Treasure Loftis, and he defeated Sarah Work (American Party) in the general election on November 8, 2022.  The election results were 1,129,961 (79.67%) for Loftis vs. 281,695 (19.86%) for Work.

Office

The Treasurer is the sole investor of the Local Government Investment Pool, (LGIP) the South Carolina Future Scholar 529 Fund and the excess funds of the state. Treasurer Loftis is the Vice Chairman of the State Fiscal Accountability Authority.

Treasurer Loftis is Chairman of the Board of Financial Institutions which supervises state chartered financial institutions and supervises mortgage originators and lenders, finance companies, pay day lenders, and title lenders. He is a member of the South Carolina Retirement System Investment Commission, which manages the $27 billion fund and a member of the South Carolina Education Authority.

Other involvement in politics
Treasurer Loftis served as State Chairman of Mitt Romney's 2012 campaign in South Carolina. Treasurer Loftis served as the Chairman of South Carolina's delegation to the 2012 Republican National Convention in Tampa, Fl.

Black Lives Matter controversy 
On June 5, 2020, during the 2020 Black Lives Matter protests and immediately following the COVID-19 quarantine, Loftis made an incendiary Facebook post maligning the Black Lives Matter movement and expressing support for several far-right conspiracy theories (forced-human-microchipping, health passports, and toxic vaccinations).

National media appearances
Treasurer Loftis has appeared on numerous national news programs in addition to being quoted in several major national publications.

In June 2012, The New York Times featured Treasurer Loftis on the front page of its Sunday Business section.

In May 2012, Bloomberg News highlighted Treasurer Loftis' calls for more standards when it comes to hedge funds.

Treasurer Loftis has also made several national TV appearances including live interviews on "Fox and Friends," "Fox Business Channel", "Varney and Company" CNN's John King Live, MSNBC's Martin Bashir Show, CNN   MSNBC's Election Night Special

On the national radio dial, Treasurer Loftis was featured during a live interview discussing the US debt downgrade on NPR's Tell Me More with Michele Martin.

Electoral history

References

External links 

South Carolina State Treasurer's Official Website

1958 births
21st-century American politicians
Living people
People from West Columbia, South Carolina
University of South Carolina alumni
South Carolina Republicans
State treasurers of South Carolina